Home Street Home may refer to:

A Broadway musical written by Fat Mike, Soma Snakeoil, and Jeff Marx
A forthcoming album by the rapper Spice 1
A Saint Paul, MN food truck